Armor Games is an American video game publisher and free web gaming portal. The website hosts over a thousand HTML5 (and previously Flash) browser games. Based in Irvine, California, the site was founded in 2004 by Daniel McNeely.

Armor Games primarily hosts curated HTML5/JavaScript games and MMOs, sometimes sponsoring their creation. Each game is uploaded and maintained by its original developer, and some include unlockable player achievements. Users can chat within the site and create online profiles. In December 2020, nearing end-of-life of Adobe Flash, the site announced that it will be using the Ruffle emulator for its Flash content, although many Flash games remain inaccessible.

On March 3, 2019, Armor Games revealed that they had a data breach in 2019 and that the database was sold on the Dream Market.

Notable sponsored games 

 Aether
 Coil
 Crush the Castle
 Detective Grimoire: Secret of the Swamp
 Don't Escape: 4 Days to Survive
 Fancy Pants Adventures
 GemCraft
 Kingdom Rush
 Shift
 Warfare 1917
 Waterworks!

Armor Games Studios 

Under the name Armor Games Studios, the company has begun to develop and publish indie games for Steam, mobile devices, and consoles.

Reception
PC Magazine listed it in 2007 as one of the Top 100 undiscovered websites. The American news station KSTU listed it as one of the 10 websites that they considered the best for finding "free online games".

References

External links 
 
 

Browser-based game websites
Companies based in Irvine, California
American gaming websites
American companies established in 2004
Video game companies of the United States
Video game publishers
Mobile game companies
Internet properties established in 2004
Video game companies established in 2004
2004 establishments in California
Video game development companies